Andromaque was a 40-gun   of the French Navy.

Career 
Ariane was commissioned on 1 August 1811 under Captain Nicolas Morice.

Between 21 February 1812 and 17 May,  a three-vessel French squadron consisting of the frigates  and Andromaque, and the brig  engaged in commerce raiding in the Atlantic. They made a cartel of Patent, putting their British prisoners aboard her; she arrived at Plymouth on 24 May. The American prisoners the French put on Woodrop, which they sent to America.

Returning to Lorient, the squadron encountered the British 74-gun ship-of-the-line , Captain Henry Hotham. In the ensuing Action of 22 May 1812, the two frigates ran aground trying to escape their much stronger opponent, and were set afire to prevent their capture.

See also
List of French sail frigates

Citations

References

Age of Sail frigates of France
1811 ships
Ariane-class frigates
Ships built in France
Maritime incidents in 1812
Scuttled vessels